Adriatic Gate may refer to:

 Jadranska vrata, an operator of the Port of Rijeka
 Postojna Gate, a mountain pass in Slovenia